Toll-like receptor 3 (TLR3) also known as CD283 (cluster of differentiation 283) is a protein that in humans is encoded by the TLR3 gene. TLR3 is a member of the toll-like receptor family of pattern recognition receptors of the innate immune system. TLR3 recognizes double-stranded RNA in endosomes, which is a common feature of viral genomes internalised by macrophages and dendritic cells.

Function 

TLR3 is a member of the toll-like receptor (TLR) family which plays a fundamental role in pathogen recognition and activation of innate immunity. TLRs are highly conserved from Drosophila to humans and share structural and functional similarities. They recognize pathogen-associated molecular patterns (PAMPs) that are expressed on infectious agents, and mediate the production of cytokines necessary for the development of effective immunity. The various TLRs exhibit different patterns of expression. This receptor is most abundantly expressed in placenta and pancreas, and is restricted to the dendritic subpopulation of the leukocytes. It recognizes dsRNA associated with viral infection, and induces the activation of IRF3 and NF-κB. Unlike other TLRs, TLR3 uses TRIF as the sole adaptor. IRF3 ultimately induces the production of type I interferons. It may thus play a role in host defense against viruses.

TLR3 recognizes double-stranded RNA, a form of genetic information carried by some viruses such as reoviruses. Additionally, an ephemeral form of double-stranded RNA exists as a replicative intermediate during virus replication. Upon recognition, TLR 3 induces the activation of IRF3 to increase production of type I interferons which signal other cells to increase their antiviral defenses. Double-stranded RNA is also recognised by the cytoplasmic receptors RIG-I and MDA-5.

TLR3 displays a protective role in mouse models of atherosclerosis, and activation of TLR3 signaling is associated with ischemic preconditioning-induced protection against brain ischemia and attenuation of reactive astrogliosis. Furthermore, TLR3 activation has been shown to promote hair follicle regeneration in skin wound healing. In addition, TLR3 activators show effects on human vascular cells.

Structure 

The structure of TLR3 was reported in June 2005 by researchers at The Scripps Research Institute. TLR3 forms a large horseshoe shape that contacts with a neighboring horseshoe, forming a "dimer" of two horseshoes. Much of the TLR3 protein surface is covered with sugar molecules, making it a glycoprotein, but on one face (including the proposed interface between the two horseshoes), there is a large sugar-free surface. This surface also contains two distinct patches rich in positively charged amino acids, which may be a binding site for negatively charged double-stranded RNA.

Despite being a glycoprotein, TLR3 crystallises readily – a prerequisite for structural analysis by x-ray crystallography.

Ligands 
 Antagonists
 CU-CPT4a

References

Further reading 

 
 
 

Clusters of differentiation
3